This list of American architects includes notable architects and architecture firms with a strong connection to the United States (i.e., born in the United States, located in the United States or known primarily for their work in the United States). For a more complete list, see :Category:American architects and :Category:Architecture firms of the United States.

Individuals

A

B

C

D

E

F

G

H

I

J

K

L

M

N

O

P

R

S

T

U

V

W

Y

Z

Firms

See also

 Architecture of the United States
 List of architects
 Lists of Americans
 
 List of African-American architects

 
 
Architects
American
Architects